Alexandre Lordkipanidze (born October 12, 1988) is a Georgian poet, playwright and novelist.

Biography
Alexandre Lordkipanidze was born in 1988. In 2009, he graduated from Shota Rustaveli Theatre and Film University. In 2011, he received the Master’s Degree from the same university.

Lordkipanidze is one of the founders of poetry group Pink Bus. The group released their first and only poetry collection of the same name in 2007.

Bibliography
In 2013, he published his first poetry collection, called Transparent. In 2014, Lordkipanidze wrote script for Georgian film Lost in Escapade.

In 2016, Lordkipanidze's play called 'The Island' was staged in Rustaveli Theatre in Tbilisi and in Ilia Chavchavadze State Drama Theatre in Batumi.

In 2017, Lordkipanidze wrote a children's book, named 'Lullaby for Lilly'.

In 2018, Lordkipanidze was nominated for Tsinandali Literature Award and won award in Poetry for 'The Reddish and Blackish'. In 2019, Lordkipanidze won Georgia's leading literary contest Saba for Play of the Year.

Poetry
 The Reddish and Blackish (მოწითალო და მოშავო) (2018)
 Transparent (გამჭვირვალე) (2013)
 Polly Pollack (პოლი პოლაკი) (2012)
 Blue (ლურჯი) (2010)

Short Stories
 Lullaby for Lilly (იავნანა ლილისთვის) (2017)
 The 15 best Georgian stories (15 საუკეთესო ქართული მოთხრობა) (2014)
 Insomnia 2013 (ინსომნია 2013) (2013)
 The 15 best Georgian stories (15 საუკეთესო ქართული მოთხრობა) (2013)
 The 15 best Georgian stories (15 საუკეთესო ქართული მოთხრობა) (2012)

Plays
 The Island (კუნძული) (2016)

Collection of Plays
 Distoplays (დისტოპიესები) (2017)

Scripts
 Lost in Escapade (დაკარგულები) (2014) 
 Host and screenwriter for TV Show "The Bookshelf (წიგნების თარო)" (2018–present)

Literary Prizes and Awards
 Literary Award "Saba" for the Best Play of the Year "Distoplays" (2019)
 Literary Award "Tsinandali" for "The Reddish and Blackish" (2018)
 Rustaveli Theatre Award for "Play of the year" for "The Island" (2016)
 24-Hour Theatre Festival Prizes for best play [for "Schrödinger's cat is dead" ("შრედინგერის კატა მკვდარია")] (2012)  
 24-Hour Theatre Festival Prizes for best play [for "My native Big-Mac" ("ჩემი მშობლიური ბიგ-მაკი")] (2011)  
 Literary Award "Alubloba" for Best Sci-fi short story (2009)

References

External links
 Profile at Georgia National Book Center
 Profile at Intelekti Publishing

1988 births
Writers from Tbilisi
Living people
Postmodern writers
Novelists from Georgia (country)